This is a list of Nigerian films released in 1998.

Films

See also 

 List of Nigerian films

References

External links 

 1998 films at the Internet Movie Database

1998
Lists of 1998 films by country or language
1998 in Nigeria
1990s in Nigerian cinema